Cornelia Yzer (born 28 July 1961) is a German politician of the Christian Democratic Union (CDU) and former member of the German Bundestag.

Life 
From 1990 to 1998 Yzer was a member of the German Bundestag as a directly elected member of the constituency Märkischer Kreis I (NRW). On 3 May 1992 she was appointed Parliamentary State Secretary to the then Federal Minister for Women and Youth Angela Merkel in the Federal Government led by Helmut Kohl. After the 1994 federal elections, she moved in the same position to the Federal Minister of Education, Science, Research and Technology, where she was responsible in particular for the Research Fields Energy and Environment, Aeronautics and Space, Multimedia and Biotechnology.

Literature

References

1961 births
Members of the Bundestag for North Rhine-Westphalia
Members of the Bundestag 1994–1998
Members of the Bundestag 1990–1994
Female members of the Bundestag
20th-century German women politicians
Members of the Bundestag for the Christian Democratic Union of Germany
Parliamentary State Secretaries of Germany
Living people